Callidula atata is a moth in the family Callidulidae first described by Charles Swinhoe in 1909. It is found on the Kei Islands of Indonesia.

References

Callidulidae
Moths described in 1909